Events from the year 1762 in Canada.

Incumbents
French Monarch: Louis XV
British and Irish Monarch: George III

Governors
Governor of the Province of Quebec: Jeffery Amherst
Colonial Governor of Louisiana: Louis Billouart
Governor of Nova Scotia: Jonathan Belcher
Commodore-Governor of Newfoundland: Richard Edwards

Events
 November 3 – According to the preliminaries of peace, signed at Fontainebleau, England is to have, with certain West Indies, Florida, Louisiana, to the Mississippi River (without New Orleans), Canada, Acadia, Cape Breton Island and its dependencies, and the fisheries, subject to certain French interests. Spain is to have New Orleans and Louisiana, west of the Mississippi, with an undetermined Western boundary.

Births
July 17 : Alexander Macdonell, Roman Catholic bishop (died 1840 in Scotland)

Deaths
August 28 : Augustin de Boschenry de Drucour, governor of Isle Royale.

Historical documents
Seeking to improve its fisheries position at peace talks, France captures Newfoundland, and loses it again three months later

France "renounces all Pretensions" to Nova Scotia and cedes Canada and Cape Breton to Britain, which grants religious liberty to Catholics

Seigneuries ("fiefs") of Canada are "deemed noble," with eldest son inheriting one half, and his male siblings sharing other half

"The Canadians [are], in general, of a litigious disposition" with "multiplicity of Instruments" (to be replaced by "short and well digested Code")

"Canadians in general are not much given to drunkenness, yet Men, Women and Children are used to drink a certain quantity of strong Liquors"

Jesuits have missions to Indigenous people near Quebec at Jeune-Lorette (Wendat) and at Tadoussac and Chicoutimi (Innu; Note: "savages" used)

Quebec general hospital is run by "ladies[...]of the best Families," but war and French king's unpaid debt must leave them in "utmost beggary"

Canadians being "extremely tenacious of their Religion," British by not altering it and rebuilding "their great Church" would earn their loyalty

Brief profiles of Innu, Huron-Wendat, Wolastoqiyik and Abenaki, with pledge of justice and instant redress of their complaints (Note: racial stereotypes)

Soil is good, but Canadians are lazy and "not much skilled in Husbandry," and corrupted by "avaricious Men" (which British rule will end)

With end of Canada's monopolies and more opportunity, trade in cod, whale products, naval stores, furs, hemp and flax, and potash will flourish

British will end Canadian gentry's privilege, should keep clergy "in proper subjection," and have won over peasantry with generosity and lenity

Excellent but misused iron industry near Trois-Rivières can be revived and expanded to supply Navy "with proper Iron for Ship Building"

After detailing fur trade abuses, Gen. Thomas Gage suggests limiting western posts to five: Kaministiquia, Michilimackinac, Detroit and two others

Catching whitefish at Sault Ste. Marie requires great skill in canoeing as well as netting

Nova Scotia Council worried about security with so many Acadian prisoners in Halifax, and even more so in small unprotected settlements

With Anglo-French hostilities ended, Commissioners for Trade and Plantations find it "neither necessary nor politic" to expel Acadians

Nova Scotia executive authorized to borrow up to £4,500 to cover unpaid bounties and public works expenses, and to suspend bounties

"Frauds and other Injuries [in] Trade and Dealing" committed against Indigenous people in Nova Scotia are to be prosecuted upon complaint

For dissent or desertion "in Times of imminent Danger," Nova Scotia militia officers will be cashiered and lower ranks fined or imprisoned

Seaman in St. John's harbor court-martial, sentenced for desertion to 600 lashes over 2 days, reprieved after first day for "imminent danger of his Life"

References

 
Canada
62